Denmark competed at the 1988 Summer Paralympics in Seoul, South Korea. 48 competitors from Denmark won 64 medals including 23 gold, 19 silver and 22 bronze, finishing 11th in the medal table.

See also 
 Denmark at the Paralympics
 Denmark at the 1988 Summer Olympics

References 

Nations at the 1988 Summer Paralympics
1988
Paralympics